Baddiel's Syndrome is a British television sitcom that originally aired on Sky One in 2001. It centered on a therapy-attending architect played by David Baddiel.

Cast
David Baddiel as David
Morwenna Banks as Eva Starzia Schnorbitz Melitzskova
Peter Bradshaw as Peter
Demetri Goritsas as Ethan
Kim Thomson as Sian
Stephen Fry as The Psychiatrist
Jonathan Bailey as Josh
Gareth Thomas as Colin

External links

2001 British television series debuts
2001 British television series endings
2000s British sitcoms
English-language television shows
Sky sitcoms